Foley Street is a street in Dublin running from James Joyce Street to Buckingham Street Lower. It was formerly known as Worlds End Lane and Montgomery Street.

History
Initially Foley was known as Worlds End Lane or World's End Lane in the Georgian period, and denoted that the street was at the very edge of the city at the time and its proximity to the shore line which was known as World's End. The area was further developed in the 1780s following the construction of the Custom House. On John Rocque's 1756 map of Dublin, the area shows market gardening and some industrial activity.

The street was later named Montgomery Street after the wife of Luke Gardiner, Elizabeth Montgomery. It is from this street name that the name of the historical red light district, the Monto, was derived. It was then renamed Foley Street, named after the 19th century sculptor, John Henry Foley.

In 1975, a documentary was made about some of the children of the street called The Boys of Foley Street by Pat Kenny, with follow-ups in 1988 and 2008. The theatre company Anu Productions created an interactive theatrical piece based on the documentary in 2012 as part of their four part Monto Cycle of plays.

Notable buildings
The Dublin City Council has its art office and gallery space, the LAB, on Foley Street. This building is shared with Dance Ireland. It was opened in 2005.

References

Streets in Dublin (city)